Heng:garæ (헹가래) is the seventh extended play by South Korean boy group Seventeen. It was released on June 22, 2020, by Pledis Entertainment. The album has six tracks, including the singles "My My"
and "Left & Right".

Commercial performance
Prior to the album's release, Pledis announced that the albums had sold over 1,060,000 pre-orders, the highest ever for Seventeen since their debut.
Heng:garæ later sold 1,207,513 copies in June, making it Seventeen's 1st million selling album.

Track listing

Charts

Weekly charts

Year-end charts

Certifications

References

Seventeen (South Korean band) EPs
2020 EPs
Korean-language EPs
Hybe Corporation EPs